Jessica Pilz (born 22 November 1996) is an Austrian professional rock climber.

She started competing in 2010, both in lead climbing and bouldering. From 2011 to 2015, she won six international youth competitions in lead climbing. In 2014, she also won both the European Youth Cup and Youth Championships in bouldering.

In 2017 she won the Winter Military World Games both in lead climbing and bouldering. In 2018, she won the Lead Climbing World Championships in Innsbruck, by climbing the route a few seconds faster than the former World Champion, Janja Garnbret. She rarely climbs outdoor, but she does it with gratifying results. In January 2016, during a short trip to Oliana (Spain), she was able to redpoint two  routes.

In 2019 Pilz placed 10th in the Combined World Championships, qualifying her for the 2020 Olympics, where she finished 7th.

Rankings

Climbing World Cup

Climbing World Championships 
Youth

Adult

Climbing European Championships 
Youth

Adult

Sport climbing at the Winter Military World Games

European Youth Cup

Number of medals in the Climbing World Cup

Lead

Bouldering

Gallery

References

External links 

 Profile on Adidas-Rockstars.com
 
 
 
 

Female climbers
Living people
1996 births
Austrian rock climbers
Competitors at the 2017 World Games
Sport climbers at the 2020 Summer Olympics
20th-century Austrian women
21st-century Austrian women
World Games gold medalists
Competitors at the 2022 World Games
IFSC Climbing World Championships medalists
IFSC Climbing World Cup overall medalists